The 18th European Badminton Championships were held in Malmö, Sweden, between 13  and 20 April 2002, and hosted by the European Badminton Union and Svenska Badmintonförbundet.

Venue
This tournament was held at the Baltiska hallen, in Malmö.

Medalists

Results

Semi-finals

Finals

Medal account

References

External links
 Official website
 Tournament draw at 'sbg.ac.at
 Results at badmintoneurope.com

European Badminton Championships
E
B
B
Badminton tournaments in Sweden
2000s in Malmö